= Shu Ying =

Shu Ying is a Chinese musician, singer-songwriter, writer and composer. She is a multi-instrumentalist and primarily plays guitar and keyboard.

== Career ==
In 2012, she formed an electronic dance band named Quadruple Cherry as vocalist, guitarist and composer, with members from Little Wizard's former guitarist Wang Kai as drummer and guitarist Wang Xiaoyu of a latter shoegazing band called City Flanker. On April 1, 2013, Quadruple Cherry released an EP with two singles. "Complexion" from this EP was also released by Xing Wai Xing records in the compilation album Wu Cheng Ji, this album was rewarded as the best compilation album of 2014 Chinese Music Media Awards.

In 2014, she joined Undress For Success as keyboardist, a project from former Battle Cattle bassist Laurent. In 2015, she started to work on solo project with the help from Laurent as producer. After releasing several digital singles by herself, she released a solo EP produced by Laurent, Are You Still A Teenager?, with five new tracks. This EP is recorded in Juju's recording studio located in Lane 1639 Huashan Lu. Shu Ying recorded vocal and guitar, Laurent did the drums. Her EP is described as "What a gem, full of anxious aggression and a volatile attitude that weavers between yearning and confrontational, between sarcastic and pungent it's a stellar addition to the artist's catalog, one that may remind some of 90s alt rockers such as PJ Harvey and Liz Phair."

In the summer of 2017, Shu Ying made a trip to Netherlands and started a one-week recording session with producer Idan Altman. She released her full-length album Girl's Girl's World under Waving Cat Records on October 20, 2017. Neocha described as 'Shu Ying inhabits her own radiantly untamed melodies amidst the loud, discordant, confused noise of twenty-first-century Shanghai. With songs full of attitude and vulnerability, disclosure, and distance, her music is an exciting presence on the Chinese indie music scene.' It was listed as top 25 albums released of year 2017 in China by The Beijinger, described as ''the snappy, profoundly catchy, emotionally rich LP Girl’s Girl’s World. It’s rock and roll streamlined with a clear ear for what’s makes a chorus pop, with lyrics that are on the mark, and more importantly, a voice that stings with emotional honesty and pulpy aplomb.'' The music video of Hardly Spoken Girl was listed as 7 stellar music videos from around the globe by YabYum Music + Arts in 2017 issue.

Since the late of 2019, she relocated to Europe. In 2020, she released a new album named Felt inspired by her recent experiment in jazz and electronica while keeping her acid folk roots.

== Discography ==
- Are You Still A Teenager? (2015)
- Girl's Girl's World (2017)
- Felt (2020)
